During the German Invasion of Poland in September 1939, Wehrmacht, Gestapo and Einsatzkommando soldiers in Dynów on the first day of Jewish New Year (Rosh Hashanah) mass murdered 170-200 Jewish civilians from the town. 150 Jews were mass murdered by machine guns after being taken away from the town on trucks. 50 Jews were burned alive in their prayer house.

References

1939 in Poland
Massacres in 1939
Holocaust massacres and pogroms in Poland
September 1939 events
Einsatzgruppen
Attacks during the New Year celebrations